For The Dear Old Flag, I Die is an American Civil War song. It was originally a poem written by George Cooper. The music by Stephen Foster was later added in. The song interprets the last words of a drummer boy who was fatally wounded at the Battle of Gettysburg.

Fiction
In the 2015 video game Hotline Miami 2: Wrong Number, a shortened version of the poem is included in the end credits of the game when the game is completed on Hard Mode.

References

American patriotic songs
Songs of the American Civil War
Songs written by Stephen Foster
Year of song missing